Hillel Zaks (February 2, 1931 – January 13, 2015) was the founder and rosh yeshiva of Yeshivas Knesses Hagedolah in Kiryat Sefer.

He was the son of Mendel and Faiga Chaya Zaks, the youngest daughter of Israel Meir Kagan.

He served as one of Hebron Yeshiva's senior roshei yeshiva until he founded Yeshivas Knesses Hagedolah in Kiryat Sefer.

References

2015 deaths
1931 births
Haredi rabbis in Israel
Israeli people of Polish-Jewish descent
Israeli Rosh yeshivas
Polish Haredi rabbis